Donald William Bradley Robinson  (9 November 19227 September 2018) was an Australian bishop in the Anglican Church of Australia. He was Archbishop of Sydney from 1982 to 1992.

Family and education
Robinson was born in Lithgow, New South Wales on 9 November 1922, the son of Richard Bradley Robinson, sometime Archdeacon of North Sydney. His first year of secondary school studies was at North Sydney Boys High School; he was then educated at Sydney Church of England Grammar School, the University of Sydney and Queens' College, Cambridge. His undergraduate studies were interrupted by service in World War II. His niece is the retired actress and working psychologist Belinda Bauer.

Ordained ministry
Robinson was ordained in 1950 by Howard Mowll, Archbishop of Sydney, and began his ministry with curacies at St Matthew's, Manly and St Philip's Church, Sydney. He was then a lecturer and vice-principal at Moore College and later at Sydney University until 1973 when he became the Bishop of Parramatta. He was consecrated a bishop on 25 January 1973 at St Andrew's Cathedral, Sydney. Nine years later he was elected as Archbishop of Sydney and the Metropolitan of New South Wales.

Michael Jensen argues that, along with that of Bill Dumbrell and Graeme Goldsworthy, Robinson's work "has been crucial for shaping how Sydney Anglicans think about and preach from the Bible."

Robinson was made an Officer of the Order of Australia in 1984.

References

1922 births
2018 deaths
People educated at Sydney Church of England Grammar School
University of Sydney alumni
Alumni of Queens' College, Cambridge
Academic staff of the University of Sydney
Academic staff of Moore Theological College
Assistant bishops in the Anglican Diocese of Sydney
Anglican archbishops of Sydney
20th-century Anglican archbishops
Officers of the Order of Australia
People educated at North Sydney Boys High School
Evangelical Anglican bishops